Mihailo Dedeić (born 8 November 1938) commonly referred to by his birth name Miraš Dedeić, is the second and current head of the non-canonical Montenegrin Orthodox Church. Since 6 January 1997, he has been styled as His Beatitude the Archbishop of Cetinje and Metropolitan of Montenegro.

Biography 
He was born in 1938 in the village of Ramovo Ždrijelo on Durmitor. He graduated from the Faculty of Theology in Belgrade in 1969. He completed his postgraduate studies at the Pontifical Oriental Institute in Rome in 1973 and later attended postgraduate studies at the Russian Theological Academy of St. Sergius in Zagorsk.

After finishing his studies he worked in the state archives of SFR Yugoslavia, Soviet Union and Italy in the Roman representation of the Ecumenical Patriarchate of Constantinople and later served as a priest of the Patriarchate of Constantinople. His service with Patriarchate of Constantinople ended in 1997, when Patriarch Bartholomew gave a statement saying that Dedeić had been dismissed for canonical offenses, that his priestly rank had been revoked, and that he had been reinstated as a layman.

On 6 January 1997 in Cetinje, he was proposed and elected head of the Montenegrin Orthodox Church. On 31 October 1998 in Cetinje, he was enthroned as Metropolitan of the Montenegrin Orthodox Church.

Political views 
At the beginning of Croatian War of Independence Dedeić gave a statement to the Italian media saying that the war started because of the "desire of the Croatian leadership to take over Serbian territories". He called Dubrovnik a "Serbian city", while comparing Croatian President Franjo Tuđman to Adolf Hitler.

During the 1992-1995 Bosnian War, Dedeić had been fundraising to support the Army of Republika Srpska under Ratko Mladić's command during his plight to support the Serbs fighting the Bosnian Muslims and Croats.

In a Croatian TV show "Bujica", Dedeić stated that Serbia "committed genocide" in Montenegro in 1918 and 1920 and that Serbs are a "disruptive factor in the Balkans and that they should land a little, because there is no longer Greater Serbia". He also added that Croatia has the right to form the Croatian Orthodox Church.

References 

1938 births
Living people
People from Žabljak
University of Belgrade Faculty of Orthodox Theology alumni
Archbishops of the Montenegrin Orthodox Church
Clergy removed from office
Scandals in Eastern Orthodox organizations
People excommunicated by the Greek Orthodox Church
People excommunicated by the Serbian Orthodox Church
Clergy from Cetinje
Montenegrin Orthodox Church